The 2016 South Dakota Democratic presidential primary was held on June 7 in the U.S. state of South Dakota as one of the Democratic Party's primaries ahead of the 2016 presidential election.

The Democratic Party's primaries in California, Montana, New Jersey and New Mexico were held the same day, as are Republican primaries in the same five states, including their own South Dakota primary. Additionally, the Democratic Party held North Dakota caucuses the same day.

Opinion polling

Results

Results by county

Source:

Analysis
South Dakota, a predominantly white and rural state in the Great Plains with a significant Native American population, was split near evenly between Clinton and Sanders in terms of geography and delegate count. Secretary Clinton carried the eastern portion of the state, with the exception of Roberts County in the northeast corner. She edged out Sanders in Minnehaha County, the most populated county and home to Sioux Falls. Lincoln County (Canton), Brown County (Aberdeen), Brookings County (Brookings), Codington County, (Watertown), Yankton County (Yankton, South Dakota), Davison County (Mitchell), and Hughes County (home to the state capital Pierre), all gave Clinton substantial margins that were enough for her to carry one of the most Republican states in the country.

Senator Bernie Sanders kept the race close by winning the western portion, which is far more rural than the eastern half and tends to vote more Republican in presidential elections. The most populated county in the region and second most populous in the state, Pennington County, home to Rapid City, gave Sanders an 8.3% margin over Clinton. Sanders also carried the counties of Oglala Lakota, Jackson, and Bennett, which are part of the Pine Ridge Indian Reservation. These counties are among the most poverty stricken in the United States (as Sanders tends to do well among voters with low incomes), with the census-designated place of Allen in Bennett County being considered the poorest municipality in the entire country. Sanders also carried several other Native American reservations including neighboring Rosebud Indian Reservation to the east, the Cheyenne River Indian Reservation to the north, and its neighbor Standing Rock Indian Reservation, part of which stretches into North Dakota.

Sanders had visited the Pine Ridge reservation in May, where he spoke to residents and was warmly welcomed by Native American tribal leaders, talking about the need to improve health care and education on reservations and maintain tribal sovereignty. Other issues brought up by Sanders including the Keystone Pipeline and fracking, which many Native Americans had expressed opposition towards. Another likely reason for the large amount of Native American support for Sanders was towards a controversial comment Secretary Clinton made in April after Donald Trump became the presumptive nominee where she stated, "I have a lot of experience dealing with men who sometimes get off the reservation in the way they behave and how they speak." The remarks were considered offensive by many people, and likely benefitted Sanders (though Clinton appeared to do well among Native Americans in New Mexico the same day).

See also
 2016 South Dakota Republican presidential primary

References

South Dakota
Democratic primary
2016